Franck Belot (born 18 March 1972, in Athis-Mons) is a former French rugby union player. He played as a lock.

He played for Stade Toulousain. He won to win six titles of French Champion, for 1994, 1995, 1996, 1997, 1999 and 2001 and the first European Cup in 1996. He earned his only cap with the French national team on 19 March 2000 against Ireland at Stade de France.

Honours 
 French rugby champion, 1994, 1995, 1996, 1997, 1999 and 2001
 Challenge Yves du Manoir 1993, 1995 and 1998
 Heineken Cup 1996

External links 
 http://www.espnscrum.com/statsguru/rugby/player/13335.html
 http://www.ercrugby.com/fra/statistiques/archives_joueurs.php?player=1981&includeref=dynamic

Living people
1972 births
French rugby union players
France international rugby union players
Stade Toulousain players
Rugby union locks